Psalm 70 is the 70th psalm of the Book of Psalms, beginning in English in the King James Version: "Make haste, O God, to deliver me". The Book of Psalms is part of the third section of the Hebrew Bible, and a book of the Christian Old Testament. In the slightly different numbering system used in the Greek Septuagint and Latin Vulgate translations of the Bible, this psalm is Psalm 69.  In Latin, it is known as "Deus, in adiutorium meum intende". 

There are 5 verses (6 in the Hebrew verse numbering). The entire psalm is almost identical to the closing verses of Psalm 40. Verse 1 is used as the liturgical opening prayer to every hour of the Liturgy of the Hours.

The psalm forms a regular part of Jewish, Catholic, Lutheran, Anglican and other Protestant liturgies. It has often been set to music, especially in music for vespers which its beginning opens, such as in Monteverdi's Vespro della Beata Vergine.

Background and themes
The opening verse in the Hebrew identifies this psalm as one of remembrance ("to remember"). This opening term appears in only one other psalm, Psalm 38. 

This entire psalm is virtually identical to the closing verses of Psalm 40 (verses 14–18 in the Hebrew, 13–17 in the KJV). According to the Malbim, Psalm 40 was composed by David when he was fleeing from Saul, and David repeated this psalm later when he was fleeing from Absalom. The Midrash Tehillim notes a slight discrepancy between verse 6 here ("But I am poor and needy, O God, make haste unto me") and verse 18 in Psalm 40 ("But I am poor and needy, may the Lord think of me"). The Midrash teaches that David was telling God, "Think of me in my poverty and in my need, and You will then make haste to deliver me, for You are my help and my deliverer".

Regarding the similarity between Psalms 40 and 70, Matthew Henry notes that it can sometimes be efficacious to recite the prayers one prayed in similar situations, investing them with new emotion.

The opening verse is literally "God, to deliver me, to my help! Hurry!" It is a sped up and abbreviated version of Psalm 40:14. This is consistent with hasten used repeatedly in the opening. In some views, the first verses of Psalm 40 concern the coming anointed and His deliverance, while the later verses concern the desperate in general. It is the later verses of Psalm 40 carried over to Psalm 70.

Text

Hebrew Bible version
Following is the Hebrew text of Psalm 70:

King James Version
 Make haste, O God, to deliver me; make haste to help me, O .
 Let them be ashamed and confounded that seek after my soul: let them be turned backward, and put to confusion, that desire my hurt.
 Let them be turned back for a reward of their shame that say, Aha, aha.
 Let all those that seek thee rejoice and be glad in thee: and let such as love thy salvation say continually, Let God be magnified.
 But I 𝘢𝘮 poor and needy: make haste unto me, O God: thou art my help and my deliverer; O , make no tarrying.

Uses

Judaism
Psalm 70 is traditionally recited in wartime.

Catholic
The first verse of this psalm, "Deus in adjutorium meum intende" (O God, come to my assistance), with the response, "Domine ad adjuvandum me festina" (O Lord, make haste to help me), forms the introductory prayer to every Hour of the Roman, monastic, and Ambrosian Breviaries, except during the last three days of Holy Week, and in the Office of the Dead. While these words are said or sung, all present sign themselves with the sign of the cross.

Book of Common Prayer
In the Church of England's Book of Common Prayer, this psalm is appointed to be read on the evening of the 13th day of the month.

Musical settings 
As the standard phrase to open liturgical Hours, the beginning of Psalm 70 was often set to music, especially as part of music for vespers services. Claudio Monteverdi wrote a six-part setting with orchestra to begin his Vespro della Beata Vergine, published in 1610, using a revised version of the opening Toccata of his opera L'Orfeo, scored for two cornettos, three trombones, strings, and continuo. It has been described as a "call to attention" and "a piece whose brilliance is only matched by the audacity of its conception".

Heinrich Schütz set the psalm in a metred version in German, "Eil, Herr mein Gott, zu retten mich", SWV 167, as part of the Becker Psalter, first published in 1628.

Baldassare Galuppi composed a four-part setting of the complete psalm in Latin for choir and orchestra.

In 1691, Michel-Richard de Lalande composed a grand motet (catalogué S.33) for chorus, soloists and treble strings. Henry Desmarest composed a grand motet "Deus in adjuditorium" (unknown date).

Benjamin Britten set this psalm to music as part of the score he wrote for the play This Way to the Tomb in 1945. In 1951 Alan Hovhaness set the first verse in his choral work Make Haste.

References

Cited sources
 
Attribution

External links 

 
 
 
 
 Text of Psalm 70 according to the 1928 Psalter
 Psalms Chapter 70 text in Hebrew and English, mechon-mamre.org
  For the leader; of David. For remembrance. / Graciously rescue me, God / Come quickly to help me, LORD! text and footnotes, usccb.org United States Conference of Catholic Bishops
 Psalm 70:1 introduction and text, biblestudytools.com
 Psalm 70 – – Help Quickly, O Lord enduringword.com
 Psalm 70 / Refrain: Come to me quickly, O God. Church of England
 Psalm 70 at biblegateway.com

070
Works attributed to David